The 1992 Air Canada Cup was Canada's 14th annual national midget 'AAA' hockey championship, which was played April 21 – 26, 1992 at the Dartmouth Sportsplex in Dartmouth, Nova Scotia.  The Lions du Lac-St Louis from Quebec defeated the Thunder Bay Kings to win their third gold medal.  The host Dartmouth Kings took the bronze medal.

Teams

Round robin

Standings

Scores

Lac St-Louis 4 - Dartmouth 0
Thunder Bay 3 - Miramichi 2
North Kamloops 5 - Mississauga 5
Dartmouth 3 - Thunder Bay 0
Lac St-Louis 8 - Miramichi 1
Thunder Bay 3 - North Kamloops 0
Mississauga 1 - Lac St-Louis 1
Dartmouth 4 - Miramichi 1
North Kamloops 5 - Lac St-Louis 2
Thunder Bay 4 - Mississauga 2
Dartmouth 4 - North Kamloops 3
Mississauga 8 - Miramichi 5
Lac St-Louis 6 - Thunder Bay 0
Mississauga 4 - Dartmouth 3
North Kamloops 7 - Miramichi 4

Playoffs

Semi-final
(3) Thunder Bay 2 - (2) Dartmouth 1 OT

Gold-medal game
(1) Lac St Louis 6 - (3) Thunder Bay 1

Individual awards
Most Valuable Player: Dustin Kelly (North Kamloops Lions)

See also
Telus Cup

References

External links
Telus Cup Website
Hockey Canada-Telus Cup Guide and Record Book

Telus Cup
Air Canada Cup
Ice hockey competitions in Halifax, Nova Scotia
Air Canada Cup
Air Canada Cup